Goodmayes Hospital is a mental health facility in Goodmayes in the London Borough of Redbridge. It is managed by the North East London NHS Foundation Trust.

History
The site selected had previously been occupied by Blue House Farm. The hospital, which was designed by Lewis Angell using a Compact Arrow layout and built by Leslie and Co, opened as the West Ham Borough Asylum in August 1901. It became West Ham Mental Hospital in 1918 and a major expansion of the hospital was completed in February 1934.

Dr James Harvey Cuthbert, who served as the hospital superintendent, was a pioneer of electric shock therapy in the late 1930s. The hospital, which was badly bombed during the Second World War, joined the National Health Service as Goodmayes Hospital in 1948. Part of the site was released in the early 1990s to allow the King George Hospital to be built.

Teaching 
The hospital provides clinical placements in psychiatry for medical students from Barts and The London School of Medicine and Dentistry.

Hospital Radio 
From 1975 until 2016 The Goodmayes Hospital Radio Association (GHR) broadcast to patients at Goodmayes Hospital, with a remit of informing, including and entertainment patients. Between 1993 and 2007 the station began broadcasting to neighbouring King George Hospital, London. In 2007 the studio was relocated to a larger room at Goodmayes Hospital, where the link to King Georges was lost. In 2004 the station used an on-air call sign of The Jumbo Sound. 
The station celebrated its 40th anniversary in 2015. In November 2015 the studio suffered major equipment damage following a radiator bursting and its subsequent humidity forcing the station off-air.

In April 2016 Goodmayes Hospital Radio closed and merged with Bedrock Radio. Bedrock Radio is a registered charity. 

The radio service is provided to the wards of Goodmayes Hospital by dedicated speakers in communal areas (lounges and dining rooms). Across the wider North East London NHS Foundation Trust sites patients listen through NHS WiFi.

Transport 
The hospital is served by London Buses route EL3. The nearest railway stations are Goodmayes on the Great Eastern Main Line, with services provided by the Elizabeth line, and Newbury Park on the Central line.

References

External links 

 Trust website
 Goodmayes Hospital on the NHS website
 Inspection reports from the Care Quality Commission

NHS hospitals in London
Hospital buildings completed in 1901
Hospitals established in 1901
1901 establishments in England
Psychiatric hospitals in England